Coveney is a Professor of Physical Chemistry, Honorary Professor of Computer Science, and the Director of the Centre for Computational Science (CCS) and Associate Director of the Advanced Research Computing Centre at University College London (UCL).  He is also a Professor of Applied High Performance Computing at University of Amsterdam (UvA) and Professor Adjunct at the Yale School of Medicine, Yale University. He is a Fellow of the Royal Academy of Engineering and Member of Academia Europaea. Coveney is active in a broad area of interdisciplinary research including condensed matter physics and chemistry, materials science, as well as life and medical sciences in all of which high performance computing plays a major role. The citation about Coveney on his election as a FREng says: Coveney "has made outstanding contributions across a wide range of scientific and engineering fields, including physics, chemistry, chemical engineering, materials, computer science, high performance computing and  biomedicine, much of it harnessing the power of supercomputing to conduct original research at unprecedented space and time scales. He has shown outstanding leadership across these fields, manifested through running multiple initiatives and multi-partner interdisciplinary grants, in the UK, Europe and the US. His achievements at national and international level in advocacy and enablement are exceptional".

Education
Coveney was awarded a Doctor of Philosophy degree from  the  University of Oxford in 1985 for his work on Semiclassical methods in scattering and spectroscopy.

Career
Coveney has held positions at many of the world's top institutes throughout his academic career spanning over 30 years, including the University of Oxford, Princeton University, Schlumberger and QMUL, and currently holds positions at UCL, UvA and Yale, as well as acting as a Member of several academic councils in the UK and EU.

Books
He has co-authored three popular science books with his long term friend and collaborator, Roger Highfield:

Virtual You

This book, with a foreword by Nobelist Venki Ramakrishnan, is the first popular account of efforts to build digital twins of human beings to usher in a new era of truly personalized and predictive medicine. The Financial Times listed it as a book to read in 2023.

Frontiers of Complexity

In 1996, Frontiers of Complexity: the search for order in a chaotic world was published with a foreword written by Nobelist Barry Blumberg. The Nobel Laureate Philip Warren Anderson commented: “Arguably the best general book so far on this highly complex subject. I believe firmly, with Coveney and Highfield, that complexity is the scientific frontier."  

The Arrow of Time

In 1991, Coveney and Highfield published their first book The Arrow of Time with a foreword by Nobelist Ilya Prigogine. The book became a Sunday Times top ten best-seller and New York Times notable book of the year.

Research

Coveney worked with the Nobel laureate Ilya Prigogine at the Free University of Brussels (1985-87) and went on to publish work with the mathematician Oilver Penrose on rigorous foundations of irreversibility and the derivation of kinetic equations based on chaotic dynamical systems.

He collaborated with Jonathan Wattis on extensions and generalisations of the Becker-Döring and Smoluchowski equations for the kinetics of aggregation-fragmentation processes which they applied to a wide range of phenomena, from self-reproducing micelles and vesicles to a scenario for the origin of the RNA world in which they showed that self-reproducing sequences of RNA can spontaneously arise from an aqueous mixture of the RNA nucleotide bases.

During a period of eight years when he worked at Schlumberger Cambridge Research (SCR), Coveney initiated new lines of research in which advanced computational methods played a central role. Some parts of this work, to develop highly scalable lattice-gas and, later, lattice-Boltzmann models of complex fluids, was done in collaboration with Bruce M. Boghosian, then at Thinking Machines Corporation in Cambridge, Massachusetts (USA), following Schlumberger’s acquisition of a Connection Machine, the CM-5, from the company. These models described not only the equilibrium phenomenology of amphiphilic fluids (consisting of binary and ternary mixtures of oil, water and surfactant), but also their hydrodynamic behaviour including flow in complex geometries such as porous subterranean formations encountered in oil and gas production. He created the ME3D and LB3D codes in the period from 1993-2006 which were further extended and applied widely by his team and collaborators, including as the basis for research performed by many of his former PhD students and post-docs after they took up substantive appointments across the world. Over this period, he also contributed to underlying theory and applications of other so-called mesoscale modelling and simulation methods, including dissipative particle dynamics and the stochastic rotation method.

Coveney also started other productive lines of research at that time while at SCR. Among these was the study of two-dimensional nanomaterials, including cationic and anionic clays and their interactions with water and organic compounds. Initially, this work was done to understand the mechanism by which water caused certain kinds of clays to swell and ultimately disintegrate, and ways of inhibiting this of concern to the oil and gas industry. This subsequently evolved to the study of nanocomposite materials consisting of 2d nanoparticles embedded in polymer matrices including, most recently, graphene and its role in enhancing the properties of polymeric systems.

One of the most complex systems encountered in the inorganic world is cement, although it has been known of since at least Roman times and remains in very widespread use today. The need to predict the properties of this material for construction and oilfield use is central to many industrial operations. In a forerunner of many contemporary applications of machine learning, Coveney showed that one can use a combination of infrared spectroscopy and artificial neural networks to predict the setting properties of the material, without any need to dwell on the polemics of the chemical composition of cementitious materials and the concrete that forms when it hardens. At the same time, but using methods from nonlinear dynamics, he was able to identify the rate-determining processes that enable one to design new compounds which inhibit the crystallisation of the mineral ettringite by molecular modelling.

Coveney’s work on lattice-Boltzmann models took a different turn in the period from 2006 onwards. He moved away from studying oilfield fluids to investigate blood flow in the human body, including the brain. To this end, and working with a PhD student, Marco Mazzeo, he developed a new code, named HemeLB, which simulates blood flow in the complex geometries of the human vasculature, as derived from a variety of medical imaging modalities. That code is now widely used for the study of blood flow in humans and animals. The algorithm, based on indirect addressing, scales to very large core counts on CPU-based supercomputers. Most recently, he and his team have developed a GPU-accelerated version of the code which scales to around 20,000 GPUs on the Summit supercomputer and will soon be deployed on the world’s first exascale machine, Frontier (both at Oak Ridge National Laboratory, USA).

Coveney works actively in the domain of multiscale modelling and simulation, in which models described by different physics are coupled in order to bridge large length and time scales on supercomputers. Working initially with Eirik Flekkøy on foundations of the dissipative particle dynamics method and then with Rafael Delgado-Buscalioni, he was among the first to develop theoretical schemes which couple molecular dynamics and continuum fluid dynamics representations of fluids in a single simulation. Today, his work covers numerous applications of these methods in advanced materials and biomedical domains.

The strong unifying strand in Coveney’s work which seeks to link the description of matter at the microscopic level with its macroscopic thermodynamic behaviour is manifest today in his work on the rapid, accurate, precise and reliable prediction of free energies of binding of ligands to proteins, a major topic in drug discovery. Coveney has noted that classical molecular dynamics is chaotic and to make robust predictions from it requires the use of ensembles at all times. This is a very practical manifestation of his earlier work on simpler dynamical systems, for which a thermodynamic description is possible using a probabilistic formulation. It has only become possible in the era of petascale computing, when supercomputers have grown to sufficient size to make calculations of ensemble averages feasible.

The challenge of simulating chaotic systems on digital computers remains open today. Working with Bruce Boghosian and Hongyan Wang, Coveney showed that there are a variety of problems which arise when simulating even the simplest of all dynamical systems — the generalised Bernoulli map — on a computer. The IEEE floating point numbers can produce errors which are extremely large as well others of more modest scale, but they are each wrong when compared with the known exact mathematical description of the dynamics.

In recent years, Coveney has been a leading player in the development and application of validation, verification and uncertainty quantification (VVUQ) to computer simulation codes across a wide range of domains. The VECAM Toolkit and later SEAVEA Toolkit provide a set of open-source, open-development software components which can be used to instrument any code so as to study its VVUQ characteristics. The methods his team has developed are aimed at the analysis of real-world codes of substantial complexity which run on high performance computers.

The most recent research area within which Coveney has become active is quantum computing where he is specifically concerned with seeking to assess the feasibility of realising quantum advantage from its application to the solution of molecular electronic structure problems. This field is currently a very active one, but confronting theory with actual quantum devices is arguably the most important aspect of work in this field today, despite the paucity of people participating in such research. There are many problems which must be addressed, and he and his team are currently dealing with noise reduction and implementing error mitigation as extensively as possible on a range of quantum device architectures.

He has also led several large-scale international projects, most notably, the EPSRC RealityGrid e-Science Pilot Project and its extension project, and the EU FP7 Virtual Physiological Human (VPH) Network of Excellent.  He is currently the Principal Investigator on several grants from the European Commission and other agencies, including the EU Horizon 2020 projects Verified Exascale Computing for Multiscale Applications, "VECMA" and Centre of Excellence in Computational Biomedicine,"CompBioMed2".  The original CompBioMed initiative was launched after Coveney and his team successfully challenged the EU  following a rejected grant proposal.

He has also been the recipient of many US NSF and DoE, and European DEISA and PRACE supercomputing awards, providing him and his research group access to several petascale computers and the world's first public exascale computer, Frontier.

Coveney has also chaired the UK Collaborative Computational Projects Steering Panel and has served on the programme committees of many conferences, most notably the 2002 Nobel Symposium on self-organization.  He is a founding member of the UK Government's e-Infrastructure Leadership Council and a Medical Academy Nominated Expert to the UK Prime Minister's Council for Science and Technology on Data, Algorithms and Modelling, which has led to the creation of the London-based Alan Turing Institute.

References

British physical chemists
Academics of University College London
Living people
Alumni of the University of Oxford
Computational chemists
1958 births